Obstruction Pass State Park is a public recreation area occupying  one mile southeast of Olga at the southern end of Orcas Island in San Juan County, Washington. Park activities include picnicking, fishing, crabbing, beachcombing, bird watching, and hiking on a  trail. The campground has nine tent spaces, one of which is reserved for kayakers on the Cascadia Marine Trail.

References

External links 
Obstruction Pass State Park Washington State Parks and Recreation Commission 
Obstruction Pass State Park Map Washington State Parks and Recreation Commission

State parks of Washington (state)
Parks in San Juan County, Washington
Protected areas established in 2005